This is a list of Arbëresh towns and villages organized by their region of Italy.

Abruzzo 
 Villa Badessa (part of the comune of Rosciano)

Molise 
Këmarini
Munxhifuni
Portkanuni
Ruri

Campania 
Katundi

Puglia 

Kazallveqi
Qefti
Shën Marcani

Basilicata 
Barilli
Zhura
Mashqiti
Shën Kostandini Arbëreshë
Shën Pali Arbëreshë

Calabria 
Andalli
Garafa
Marçëdhuza
Vina
Firmoza
Kantinela
Qana
Kastërnexhi
Kajverici
Çifti
Purçìll
Fallkunara
Farneta
Ferma
Frasnita
Mungrasana
Ungra
Maqi
Allimarri
Pllatëni
Shën Vasili
Shën Benedhiti
Picilia
Strihàri
Shën Mitri
Mbuzati
Shën Sofia
Spixana
Vakarici
Karfici
Puhëriu
Shën Kolli

Sicily 
Kuntisa
Hora e Arbëreshëvet
Sëndastina

External links

https://www.youtube.com/watch?v=A0svGCHB4Rg
https://www.youtube.com/watch?v=bpS5LDTFnxY
https://www.youtube.com/watch?v=YBRu4-07aMA

Albanian diaspora
 
Italian people of Albanian descent
Ethnic groups in Italy
Albanian language

bg:Арбареши
br:Arberecheg
ca:Arbëreshë
de:Arbëresh
es:Arbëreshë
eu:Arbëreshë
fr:Arbëresh
gl:Arbëreshë
it:Arbëreshë
la:Arberesca gens
hu:Arberesek
nap:Arbëreshë
no:Arbëreshë
pms:Lenga arbëreshë
pl:Arboresze
pt:Arbëreshë
ru:Арбереши
sq:Arbëreshët
scn:Arbëreshë
sv:Arberesjer
tr:Arbëresh